Helen J. Nicholson FRHistS FLSW is Professor of Medieval History and former Head of the History Department at Cardiff University. She is a world-leading expert on the military religious orders and the Crusades, including the history of the Templars.

Nicholson studied for a BA in Ancient and Modern History at St Hilda's College, University of Oxford. Nicholson was awarded her PhD from the University of Leicester in 1990 following an Open Research Scholarship. Her doctoral thesis was entitled "Images of the military orders, 1128–1291: Spiritual, secular, romantic". Her PhD was supervised by Norman Housley. Nicholson taught at the University of Leicester before her appointment as lecturer in the History Department at Cardiff University in 1994.

Publications 

 Templars, Hospitallers and Teutonic Knights: Images of the Military Orders, 1128–1291 (Leicester: Leicester University Press, 1993).
 Chronicle of the Third Crusade: A Translation of the Itinerarium Peregrinorum et Gesta Regis Ricardi with introduction and notes (Aldershot, Hants and Brookfield, VT: Ashgate, 1997).
 (edited) The Military Orders, vol. 2: Welfare and Warfare (Aldershot, Hants, and Brookfield, VT: Ashgate, 1998).
 The Knights Templar: A New History (Stroud: Sutton, 2001); 2nd edn: The Knights Templar: A Brief History of the Warrior Order (London: Constable & Robinson, 2010).
 The Knights Hospitaller (Woodbridge: Boydell and Brewer, 2001).
 Love, War, and the Grail: Templars, Hospitallers and Teutonic Knights in Medieval Epic and Romance, 1150–1500 (Leiden: Brill, 2001). 
 Medieval Warfare. Theory and Practice of War in Europe, 300-1500 (Basingstoke: Palgrave, 2003).
 The Crusades, Greenwood Guides to Historic Events of the Medieval World (Westport, CT: Greenwood, 2004) .
 (edited) Palgrave Advances in the Crusades (Basingstoke and New York: Palgrave Macmillan, 2005).
 (edited with Johannes A. Mol and Klaus Militzer) The Military Orders and the Reformation: Choices, State Building and the Weight of Tradition. Papers of the Utrecht Conference, 30 September-2 October 2004 (Hilversum: Verloren, 2006) .
 (edited with Jochen Burgtorf) International Mobility in the Military Orders (Twelfth to Fifteenth Centuries): Travelling on Christ’s Business (Cardiff: University of Wales Press, 2006) .
 (edited with Anthony Luttrell) Hospitaller Women in the Middle Ages (Aldershot, Hants and Burlington, VT: Ashgate, 2006) .
 (edited with Karl Borchardt and Nikolas Jaspert) The Hospitallers, the Mediterranean and Europe: Festschrift for Anthony Luttrell (Aldershot, Hants and Burlington, VT: Ashgate, 2007) .
 The Knights Templar on Trial: The Trial of the Templars in the British Isles, 1308-1311 (Stroud: The History Press, 2009).
 (edited with Jochen Burgtorf and Paul F. Crawford) The Debate on the Trial of the Templars (1307–1314) (Farnham, Surrey & Burlington, VT: Ashgate, 2010) .
 The Proceedings Against the Templars in the British Isles (Farnham: Ashgate, 2011).
 (edited) On the Margins of Crusading – The Military Orders, the Papacy and the Christian World, Crusades Subsidia 4 (Farnham, Surrey & Burlington, VT: Ashgate, 2011) . 
 (edited with Sarah Lambert) Languages of love and hate: conflict, communication, and identity in the medieval Mediterranean (Turnhout: Brepols Publishers 2012).
 (edited with Susan B. Edgington) Deeds done beyond the Sea: essays on William of Tyre, Cyprus and the Military Orders presented to Peter Edbury, Crusades Subsidia 6 (Farnham, Surrey & Burlington, VT: Ashgate, 2014) .
"La Damoisele del chastel": Women's Role in the Defence and Functioning of Castles in Medieval Writing from the Twelfth to the Fourteenth Centuries, in Crusader Landscapes in the Medieval Levant (2016). University of Wales Press, pp. 387–402.
 The Everyday Life of the Templars: The Knights Templar at Home (Stroud: Fonthill Media, 2017) .
 (edited with Karl Borchardt, Karoline Döring, and Philippe Josserand) The Templars and their Sources, Crusades Subsidia 10 (London: Routledge, 2017) .
 The Knights Templar (Amsterdam: University Press, 2021) ,

References

External links 
 http://booksrus.me.uk/
 
 

Year of birth missing (living people)
Living people
Alumni of St Hilda's College, Oxford
Medievalists
Fellows of the Learned Society of Wales
Fellows of the Royal Historical Society
Alumni of the University of Leicester
Historians of the Crusades